This is a list of gliders/sailplanes of the world, (this reference lists all gliders with references, where available) 
Note: Any aircraft can glide for a short time, but gliders are designed to glide for longer.

Danish miscellaneous constructors 
 Dansk Aero 2G - Dansk Aeros Verkstad
 Ellehammer N°1
 Ellehammer N°3
 Høgslund-Traugott-Olsen 2G
 Høgslund-Olsen 2G
 Projekt 8 Dolphin – Projekt 8 I/S – Helge Petersen et al.''

Notes

Further reading

External links

Lists of glider aircraft